Ion Lungu (2 August 1921 – 1 February 1988) was a Romanian footballer who played as a striker.

International career
Ion Lungu played five friendly games for Romania, scoring a goal in his debut, a 3–2 away loss against Czechoslovakia. He also scored two goals in a 4–1 away victory against Albania.

Honours
Locomotiva București
Divizia B: 1952

Notes

References

External links
Ion Lungu at Labtof.ro

1921 births
1988 deaths
Romanian footballers
Romania international footballers
Association football forwards
Liga I players
FC Rapid București players
FC CFR Timișoara players
FCV Farul Constanța players
Sportspeople from Târgu Mureș